

Administrative and municipal divisions

References

Komi Republic
Komi Republic